The term "arrested development" has had multiple meanings for over 200 years. In the field of medicine, the term "arrested development" was first used, circa 1835–1836, to mean a stoppage of physical development; the term continues to be used in the same way. In literature, Ernest Hemingway used the term in The Sun Also Rises, published in 1926: On page 51, Harvey tells Cohn, "I misjudged you [...] You're not a moron. You're only a case of arrested development." 

In contrast, the UK's Mental Health Act 1983 used the term "arrested development" to characterize a form of mental disorder comprising severe mental impairment, resulting in a lack of intelligence. However, some researchers have objected to the notion that mental development can be "arrested" or stopped, preferring to consider mental status as developing in other ways in psychological terminology. Consequently, the term "arrested development" is no longer used when referring to a developmental disorder in mental health.

In anthropology and archaeology, the term "arrested development" means that a plateau of development in some sphere has been reached. Often it is a technological plateau such as the development of high temperature ceramics, but without glaze because of a lack of materials, or copper smelting without development of bronze because of a lack of tin.   Arrested development is key in the insight of self-domestication in the evolution of hominidae where it involves being in an environment that favors reduction in aggression, including interspecific and intraspecific antagonism, for survival, in favor of attitudes that favor living together in a group, social behavior, traits that favor the group as a whole to come to the front stage, elimination of bullies - individuals with an antisocial personality disorder.

References

Developmental neuroscience
Developmental psychology
Medical terminology